Black and Brown! is a collaborative EP by Detroit-based rappers Black Milk and Danny Brown. It was released on November 1, 2011 through Fat Beats Records. The EP is entirely produced by Black Milk.

Reception
Black and Brown! received generally favorable reviews from critics. Metacritic gave the EP a score of 71, based on 5 reviews. Jayson Greene of Pitchfork Media described the EP as "22 hastily assembled, thoughtlessly sequenced minutes of vivid beats and incredible rapping." Chris Coplan of Consequence of Sound called it "a truly compelling example of what a real collaborative hip-hop album can be."

Track listing
 All tracks were produced by Black Milk.

References

External links
 

2011 EPs
Black Milk albums
Albums produced by Black Milk
Fat Beats Records albums
Danny Brown (rapper) albums
Collaborative albums